Mother of the Bride is a 1993 American made-for-television drama film that stars Kristy McNichol, who also served as producer of the movie and was directed by Charles Correll Jr. It premiered on CBS on February 27, 1993 and was released on DVD in 2006. It was preceded by Children of the Bride (1990) and Baby of the Bride (1991).

Cast
 Rue McClanahan - Margret Becker-Hix
 Kristy McNichol - Mary
 Brett Cullen - Dennis Becker
 Anne Bobby - Anne
 Conor O'Farrell - Andrew Becker
 Ted Shackelford - John Hix
 Greg Kean - Nick
 Paul Dooley - Richard Becker
 Beverley Mitchell - Jersey
 Casey Wallace - Amy
 Nan Martin - Beatrice

References

External links

1993 television films
1993 films
1993 drama films
Television sequel films
CBS network films
1990s English-language films
American drama television films
Films directed by Charles Correll
1990s American films